Berefrine (INN, USAN), also known as burefrine, is a sympathomimetic and mydriatic agent that was never marketed. It is an oxazolidine prodrug of phenylephrine, and hence, an α1-adrenergic receptor agonist.

References

Alpha-1 adrenergic receptor agonists
Prodrugs
Sympathomimetics
Tert-butyl compounds